The 1805 Treaty of Tripoli (Treaty of Peace and Amity between the United States of America and the Bey and Subjects of Tripoli of Barbary) was signed on June 4, 1805, ending the First Barbary War. It was negotiated by Tobias Lear, an ardent Jeffersonian republican, and took effect April 12, 1806 with the signature of  President Thomas Jefferson.

The United States agreed to abandon Derna (a provincial capital in eastern Libya occupied during the war) and not to supply its mercenary allies who supported Ahmad Karamanli,  the brother of Pasha Yusuf Karamanli, in his claim to be the legitimate ruler of Tripoli. The pasha agreed in return to release Ahmad's wife and children, whom he was holding hostage. The treaty also provided for an exchange of prisoners, primarily of the 297-man crew of the USS Philadelphia in exchange for 89 prisoners held by the U.S., and for a $60,000 payment by the U.S.  to Tripoli due to the difference in numbers of prisoners exchanged.

The treaty was later broken by Tripoli, leading to the Second Barbary War.

References

External links
Treaties with The Barbary Powers: 1786-1836
1805 Treaty Text and Related Documents
9th Congress, 1st Session (scroll down)

1805 treaties
1806 treaties
Barbary Wars
Tripoli (1796)
Separation of church and state in the United States
History of religion in the United States
Libya–United States relations
History of Tripoli, Libya
Christianity and law in the 18th century
9th United States Congress
Bilateral treaties of the Ottoman Empire
1805 in Africa
1805 in the Ottoman Empire
1806 in Africa
1806 in the Ottoman Empire